Bhoopali, also known as Bhoop, Bhopali, or Bhupali, is a Hindustani classical raga. Bhupālī, is a raag in Kalyan Thaat. It is a pentatonic scale (uses 5 notes in ascending and descending scale). Most of the songs in this raga are based on Bhakti rasa. Since it uses 5 notes, belongs to the "Audav jaati" of ragas.

The same raga in Carnatic music is known as Mohanam.

Raga Bhoopali, Raga Yaman, and Raga Bhairav tend to be the three basic ragas of Hindustani music, learned first by its students.

Theory 
 Karhade (2011) explains that raga Bhopali consists of just 5 notes - सा रे ग प ध (sa, re, ga, pa and dha).
It does not use Ma (also called Madhyam) and Ni (also called Nishadh). It is said that the absence of Ni (representative of physical pleasure) and Ma (representative of loving) means this raga is about non-attachment.

The Introduction consists of two parts – Aaroh आरोह (where the notes are simply recited on an ascending scale) and Avaroha (where the notes are simply recited on a descending order)

Thereafter, with these same five notes, different combinations are made by the singer, similar to short phrases, also called "chalan".

Aroha and avaroha 
The scale of Bhopali uses only Shuddh swaras.
 Aroha (ascent): Sa Re Ga Pa Dha Sa'
 Avaroha (descent): Sa'! Dha Pa Ga Re Sa

Vadi and samavadi 
 Vadi
Gandhar – ga

 Samavadi
Dhaivat – Dha

Alap 

 S, D1 D1...S, R - - S...D1 S..., D1 - - - P1, S - - - D1 S - - D1 P1, P1 D1, D1 D1 S

Pakad and chalan 
The Pakad (catchphrase that often helps in identifying a raga) is:

S R G R S D1 S R G

or:

S R G R S D1 S R G P G D P G R S

or:

G R P G G R S R D1 S

or:

G R S D1 S R G R P G D P G R S

or:

G R P G S R D1 S

Some chalans (elaborations of the pakad) are:

 S R G R S D1 S R G
 S R G R S D1 P1
 P1 D1 S R G R G
 S R P G
 G R S R G P
 G P D P D D S’
 P G P D P D S’ R’ G’ R’ G’
 G’ R’ S’ D P G R S

Note: Normally written swaras (individual notes) indicate the middle octave. A swara immediately followed by 1 indicates the mandra saptak (lower octave) and  '  indicates the taar saptak (higher octave).

A few movements in Bhopali are important to note. There is typically a slide when descending between Sa and Dha, as well as between Pa and Ga. These slides parallel each other and can be used to create a symmetry about how the Swaras are developed. Also, many performers will bring out the Kalyan flavor of Bhopali by using  of the notes  Ni and  Ma. That is to say, these notes are only vaguely suggested in passing ornaments, not actually sung for long enough for the Swara to become a clear part of the Raga. Some examples would be:

(N1)D1 S

P(m)P(m) D P

where the notes in parenthesis are connected by slides or sung as meend.

Bandish 

This bandish is bound with Teentaal (16 beats).

1 2 3 4 | 5 6 7 8 | 9 10 11 12 | 13 14 15 16 |

Asthayi:

D S D2 P | G2 R2 S R2 |

G2 _ G2 P | G2 R2 S _    |

S R2 G2 P | R2 G2 P D2 |

G2 P D2 P | G2 R2 S _   |

Antara:

G2 _ G2 G2 |P _ D2 P |

S' _ S'   S'   |D3 R3 S'  _|

G3 G3 R3 S'|R3 R3 S' D3|

S' _ D2 P |G2 R2 S _|

The Asthayi starts with the 9th beat.

Organisation and relationships 

Raga Bhoopali belongs to the Kalyan Thaat.

Related ragas: Deshkar (a pentatonic raga belonging to the Bilawal Thaat with the same scale as Bhoopali). Shuddha Kalyan is another similar raga.

Samay (Time) 
First part of night. 7-9

Rasa 
Bhakti Rasa (Devotional)

The essence from the raga evokes the Shanti Rasa – peaceful and calming.

The Rasa can also be called Shanta Rasa

Film songs 

Bhoopali is a popular raga used in Indian folk songs, and thus in Hindi and other regional film songs.

Hindi:
 "Jyoti Kalash Chhalke" (Bhabhi Ki Chudiyan) (1961)
 "Pankh Hote To Udd Aati Re" (Sehra) (1963)
 "Main Jahaan Rahoon" (Namastey London) (2007)
 "Dil Hoom Hoom Kare" (Rudaali) (1993)
 "Sayonara Sayonara" (Love in Tokyo) (1966)
 "Dekha ek khwaab to yeh silsile hue" (Silsila) (1981)
 "Aayat" (Bajirao Mastani) (2015)
 "Neel Gagan Ki Chaanv men" (Amrapali) (1966)

Marathi:
 "Ghanashyama Sundara" (Amar Bhoopali) (1951)
 "Dehaachi Tijori" (Aamhi Jato Amuchya Gava) (1951)
 "sujana kasā mana corī" (Sangeet Natak)
 "śarayū tīrāvarī ayodhyā" (Geet Ramayan)

Tamil movie songs in Mohanam

See also 
 Durga
 Shivaranjani

References

External links 
 SRA on Samay and Ragas
 SRA on Ragas and Thaats
 Rajan Parrikar on Ragas

Hindustani ragas